Hanuman is a Hindu god and one of the most important personalities in the Ramayana, the Indian epic.

Hanuman may also refer to:
Hanuman in Jainism
Hanuman (name)
 Hanuman (1998 film), an English film 
 Hanuman (2005 film), a Hindi animated feature film
 Return of Hanuman, a 2007 sequel to the 2005 animated movie
 Anjaneya (film), a Tamil film directed by Maharajan
 Gray langur, a group of Old World monkeys
 Hanumana, Rewa, a town in Rewa district, Madhya Pradesh, India
 Raj Hamsa X-Air "H" Hanuman ultralight aircraft by Raj Hamsa Ultralights
 Sankatmochan Mahabali Hanuman, an Indian TV serial

See also
Anuman, a French video game developer
Hanu Man, an Indian superhero film